Charles Wilken (8 November 1866 – 26 February 1956) was a Danish film actor. He appeared in 32 films between 1916 and 1954.

Selected filmography
 David Copperfield (1922)
 Millionærdrengen (1936)
 En mand af betydning (1941)
 Det ender med bryllup (1943)
 Melody of Murder (1944)
 Otte akkorder (1944)

External links

1866 births
1956 deaths
Danish male film actors
Danish male silent film actors
20th-century Danish male actors